Niort-de-Sault is a commune in the Aude department, Occitania, France.

Population

Notable people
 Jean-Pierre Vaquier, murderer

See also
Communes of the Aude department

References

Communes of Aude
Aude communes articles needing translation from French Wikipedia